Jörg Van Ommen (born 27 September 1962 in Moers, North Rhine-Westphalia) is a former German racing driver. He drove for Mercedes-AMG in the DTM in 1995 and 1996, finishing in second place in 1995 in a Mercedes C-Class. He also is the nephew of Hubert Hahne and Armin Hahne.

Racing record

Complete Deutsche Tourenwagen Meisterschaft results
(key) (Races in bold indicate pole position) (Races in italics indicate fastest lap)

Complete International Touring Car Championship results
(key) (Races in bold indicate pole position) (Races in italics indicate fastest lap)

† — Retired, but was classified as he completed 90% of the winner's race distance.

Complete Super Tourenwagen Cup results
(key) (Races in bold indicate pole position) (Races in italics indicate fastest lap)

References

External links
Jörg van Ommen, Driver Database

1962 births
Living people
People from Wesel (district)
Sportspeople from Düsseldorf (region)
Racing drivers from North Rhine-Westphalia
German racing drivers
Deutsche Tourenwagen Masters drivers
ADAC GT Masters drivers
Peugeot Sport drivers
Mercedes-AMG Motorsport drivers
RSM Marko drivers
Nürburgring 24 Hours drivers
Porsche Carrera Cup Germany drivers
Sports car racing team owners